A mustard bath is a traditional therapeutic remedy for tired, stressed muscles, colds, fevers and seizures.  The mustard was thought to draw out toxins and warm the muscles, blood and body. It was a standard medical practice up until the first part of the twentieth century and continues to be used in alternative medicine.

The ancient Greeks and Romans, Europeans, and the Ayurvedic tradition of India have all used mustard in this way.

Around half a cup of ground-up mustard seeds are placed in a very hot bath, and the patient relaxes in this for about ten minutes.

See also
Mustard plaster

References

Minnie Lee Crawford,Why When and how to Bathe a Fever Patient American Journal of Nursing AJN, 1910 10(5): 314 
 William Merrick Sweet, The American Journal of the Medical Sciences,  Southern Society for Clinical Investigation (U.S.),  Daniel and Eleanor Albert Collection,Published by J.B. Lippincott, Co., 1866 Page 240
 The Lancet Published by J. Onwhyn, 1840 . Item notes: v.2 (1839-1840) Original from Harvard University Page 239
 James Braithwaite, The Retrospect of Practical Medicine and Surgery: Being a Half-yearly Journal Containing a Retrospective View of Every Discovery and Practical Improvement in the Medical Sciences Published by W.A. Townsend, 1866  Page 63

Balneotherapy
Traditional medicine